Mianning County is a county of Sichuan Province, China. It is under the administration of the Liangshan Yi Autonomous Prefecture.

History 
Mianning County has a long history of being a multi-ethnic region. The Annals of Mianning County, published during the reign of the Xianfeng Emperor (1850-1861), listed a number of major ethnic groups in the region, including the Tosu, Lizu, Yi, and the Namuzi peoples.

Climate

Administrative divisions 

Mianning County administers 1 subdistrict, 15 towns, 2 townships, and 1 ethnic township.

Subdistrict 

Towns 
The county administers the following 15 towns:

Townships 

Ethnic township 

Demographics

Ethnic groups 
A large number of the Tosu ethnic group, which comprises about 2,000 people, live throughout Mianning County.

Languages 
Two of the three Ersuic languages, the critically endangered Tosu language, and the Lizu language, are spoken within Mianning County. A 2013 survey found nine partial speakers of the Tosu language, all of whom lived in Mianning County, and were proficient in Southwestern Mandarin, which they used for daily life.

References 

 
Liangshan Yi Autonomous Prefecture
Amdo
County-level divisions of Sichuan